Ole Christoffer Heieren Hansen (born 26 February 1987) is a Norwegian footballer who plays as a defender for Kråkerøy.

Heieren Hansen was born in Fredrikstad.

Career statistics

References 

1987 births
Living people
Norwegian footballers
Sarpsborg 08 FF players
Norwegian First Division players
Eliteserien players
Sportspeople from Fredrikstad

Association football defenders